Szabolcs Szollosi may refer to:
Szabolcs Szöllősi (born 1989), Hungarian handballer
Szabolcs Szőllősi (born 1986), Hungarian speed skater